The Netherland-America Foundation also known as ”the NAF” is an American 501(c)(3), non-profit organization based in New York City with nine NAF Chapters in the United States and one NAF Chapter in the Netherlands. The mission of the Foundation is the support of exchange between the countries in education, performing and visual arts, sciences, business, and public policy.

History
The Netherland-America Foundation was founded in 1921 to support bilateral exchange between the United States of America and the Netherlands. Two of the founders were Franklin D. Roosevelt, later the U.S. president, and Thomas J. Watson, founder of IBM.  In 2004 The Netherlands-American Amity Trust was acquired by the foundation. The Foundation is currently (2019) under the patronage of members of the Royal Family of the Netherlands, Princess Margriet of the Netherlands, and her husband Pieter van Vollenhoven.

Organization
The NAF has chapters in Atlanta, Boston, Chicago, Houston, New York City, Northern California, Southern California, Washington, DC, West Michigan and the Netherlands.

Current leadership: Andy Bender (Chairman) and Willemijn Keizer (Executive Director).

References

External links
 The home page of the Foundation

Foundations based in the United States